Club Social y Deportivo Nueva Concepción, is a Guatemalan football club based in Nueva Concepción, Escuintla Department. They compete in the Primera Division, the second tier of Guatemalan football.

They play their home games in the Estadio Jose Luis Ibarra .

History
They have been playing in the second tier of Guatemalan football since the 2001/2002 season. On May 15, 2021, they were promoted back to the top tier of Guatemalan football after beating Aurora 1–0 in extra time.

Current squad

References

Football clubs in Guatemala